Knotgrass or knot grass is the common name for several plants and a moth and may refer to:

Paspalum distichum, a species of grass
Polygonum, a genus of plants in the buckwheat family, more often known as knot weed
Acronicta rumicis, a moth of the family Noctuidae